The Technics Digital Link interface was introduced by Panasonic at the Internationale Funkausstellung 2014 in Berlin as an integral part of the new "R1 Reference Class" of audio components. At the same time, Panasonic relaunched the Technics brand itself.

At the moment, only two devices are announced with this interface, the SE-R1 stereo power amplifier and the SU-R1 network audio control player/preamp.

Design 
As can be seen on the product images, the Technics Digital Link uses some kind of RJ45-styled connector and therefore most likely twisted pair cables with an unknown set of pairs.

The interface transmits digital audio data at a sample frequency of 192 kbit/s with 32-bit resolution together with some control data. The so called "VR control data" is used to adjust the output volume inside the power amp rather than in the pre-amplifier, which would be the case in analogue setups.

The left and right channels of digital audio are transmitted on separate digital links and cables which seems very unusual compared to S/PDIF, for example. If Cat.3 unshielded twisted pair cable will be used to connect the components, the cable itself would be suitable for bandwidths up to 16 MHz.

The connectors are clearly labeled as "IN" and "OUT", so the connections between the audio components will most likely be unidirectional point-to-point connections.

References

External links
official site
 Technics Hi-Fi Audio

Digital audio